Twenty Hill is a historic site and sparsely populated unincorporated area in southern Parham. 

Twenty Hill, which is located in Parham, and Jolly Beach, which is located in Jolly Bay, are the two locations in Antigua that hold the distinction of being the earliest and most significant sites of human occupation (c.1775 BC). Near the Martello Tower on the island of Barbuda is a site known as "River," which has a date of 1875 BC. Up until about 100 BC, Amerindian tribes from the Archaic period lived in Antigua and Barbuda. However, the next period didn't begin until some time before this, so there is some overlap between the Archaic and the following period.

In Twenty Hill, there is a goat farm that is known for its artisan soaps made from goat's milk.

Demographics 
Twenty Hill is located in the southern portion of the enumeration district 51001.

References 

Saint Peter Parish, Antigua and Barbuda